Stanley E. Potter (30 April 1915 – 10 August 1962) is a Canadian canoeist who competed in the 1936 Summer Olympics. In 1936 he and his partner Frank Willis finished tenth in the folding K-2 10000 m event.

References

External links
 

1915 births
1962 deaths
Canadian male canoeists
Canoeists at the 1936 Summer Olympics
Olympic canoeists of Canada